The Singapore whiskered bat (Vespertilio oreias) is or was a possible species of vesper bat endemic to Singapore. No specimens have been found since its original scientific description in 1840 by Dutch zoologist Coenraad Temminck. Modern analysis of the type specimen found it to have skull fragments from another species and the skin to be in too poor a condition to confirm as distinct species.

The holotype specism is in Naturalis Biodiversity Center in Leiden, Netherlands.

There is some uncertainty regarding its genus classification as either Vespertilio (Temminck 1840), Myotis (Tate 1941), or Kerivoula (Csorba 2016). All contending genera share Vespertilionidae as the family.

References

Mouse-eared bats
Mammals of Singapore
Mammals described in 1840
Nomina dubia
Taxonomy articles created by Polbot
Taxa named by Coenraad Jacob Temminck
Bats of Southeast Asia
Taxobox binomials not recognized by IUCN